Novel adaptation may refer to:

 Literary adaptation, the adaptation of a literary work (e.g., a novel) into another work
 Novelization, the adaptation of another work into a novel